Aarno Sulkanen (born 1 April 1940) is a Finnish actor. He has appeared in more than 70 films and television shows since 1968. He was married to Finnish actress Marjatta Raita.

Selected filmography
 Here, Beneath the North Star (1968)
 Aksel and Elina (1970)
 The Winter War (1989)

References

External links

1940 births
Living people
People from Lahti
Finnish male film actors